The Man Inside is a 1958 British crime adventure film brought to the screen by Warwick Film Productions. The screenplay from David Shaw was based on a novel by M. E. Chaber and was directed by John Gilling. The film was Bonar Colleano's last role before he died in a car accident.

Plot 
Sam Carter (Nigel Patrick) is a jeweller's clerk who dreams of stealing a fortune in diamonds and eventually does so but kills a man in the process. He then embarks on the highlife but is pursued across Europe by Milo March (Jack Palance), a private detective who suspects that not all is above board. However, March is not alone in his pursuit, as Trudi Hall (Anita Ekberg) has her own ideas as to how the money would be best spent. Also two thugs, Martin Lomer (Bonar Colleano) and Gerard Heinz (Robert Stone), are after the largest diamond in the stolen hoard. All of these characters end up fighting and trying to outwit each other over the largest diamond, which is worth $700,000, on a train travelling to London. This precious diamond is described by March as "$700,000 of unhappiness", because people are willing to do anything, even kill, to get it.

Cast

Production
Alan Ladd was originally announced to play the lead. Then Victor Mature was going to play it.

In October 1957 filming for the project was pushed back from November to April 1958 in order to allow for Warwick's challenged cash flow following the box office disappointment of Fire Under Below.

References

External links 

1958 crime films
Films shot at Associated British Studios
Films directed by John Gilling
Films scored by Richard Rodney Bennett
1958 films
Columbia Pictures films
British crime films
1950s English-language films
1950s British films